Mohamed Salleh bin Bajuri is a Malaysian politician. He is a member of the Malaysian United Indigenous Party (BERSATU), a component party of the Perikatan Nasional (PN) coalition. He has served as Treasurer-General of BERSATU since 2016.

Issues
Mohamed Salleh Bajuri was remanded by the Malaysian Anti-Corruption Commission for allegations concerning party accounts. He was released on bail on 4 March 2023.

Honours
  :
  Commander of the Order of Meritorious Service (PJN) – Datuk (2020)
  :
  Knight Commander of the Grand Order of Tuanku Jaafar (DPTJ) – Dato' (1997)

References 

Malaysian United Indigenous Party politicians
Living people
Malaysian politicians
Commanders of the Order of Meritorious Service